The Chiefdom of Mirimidong was one of the 12 tribes or polities making up the Byeonhan confederation.  It is mentioned in the Chinese text Records of the Three Kingdoms, and is generally believed to have been located near the modern-day city of Miryang in Gyeongsangnam-do, South Korea.

Later Mirimidong was absorbed into Geumgwan Gaya.  By the early 6th century, it had fallen under the sway of Silla; in 505, it was formally integrated into Silla as the county of Chuhwa-gun.

External links
 Naver Encyclopedia

Gaya confederacy
Former countries in East Asia
Former countries in Korean history
South Gyeongsang Province